Mammoth Pool Reservoir is a reservoir on the San Joaquin River in the Sierra Nevada, within the Sierra National Forest in California. It creates the border between Fresno County and Madera County.

Hydroelectric power
The  reservoir is formed by Mammoth Pool Dam, an earth-fill dam completed in 1960. It was built by Southern California Edison for hydroelectricity production. The dam's power plant can produce up to 190 megawatts. The dam, reservoir and power plant are part of the Big Creek Hydroelectric Project, perhaps the most extensive hydroelectric system in the world.

Recreation
The reservoir is also a recreation area. Activities at the lake include, swimming, fishing, camping and boating.

The reservoir is closed to the public during the month of May and the first half of June to allow migrating deer to swim across the reservoir so as to spend the summer in the Sierra Nevada highlands.

The reservoir is inaccessible following the first snowstorm, usually occurring in November, as the access road is not snowplowed.

2020 forest fire 
Road access to a campground beside the reservoir was blocked by the Creek Fire on 5 September 2020, at which point officials recommended that campers wade into the reservoir for their own protection. Many were later evacuated by helicopter.

See also
List of dams and reservoirs in California
List of lakes in California

References

External links
SCE Big Creek Hydro
Yosemite/Madera County Film - Mammoth Pool Pictures
Aerial Image at Panoramio

Sierra National Forest
Reservoirs in Fresno County, California
Reservoirs in Madera County, California
Landforms of the Sierra Nevada (United States)
San Joaquin River
Reservoirs in California
Reservoirs in Northern California